The Slovakia Men's National Floorball Team is the national floorball team of Slovakia, and a member of the International Floorball Federation.

Roster 
The roster for the 2020 WFC Qualifiers.

World Championship record

Lower divisions

Top division

References

External links
Slovak Floorball Association
Slovakia on IFF website

Men's national floorball teams
National sports teams of Slovakia
Men's national team